Kevin Tilley (born 6 September 1957) is an English former professional footballer who played in the Football League, as a defender.

Club career

Early career 
Tilley began his career as a youth team player at Queens Park Rangers.

Wimbledon 
In September 1975, Tilley joined Southern League Premier Division side Wimbledon. Having recently won the league prior to his arrival, Wimbledon went on to record further back-to-back Southern League titles as a regular member of the side. He also won two London Senior Cup titles with the club.

Tilley made 15 appearances in the Football League Fourth Division during the 1977–78 campaign.

Aylesbury United 
Tilley joined Southern League Division One South club Aylesbury United ahead of the 1978–79 season. On 9 September, he made his debut in a 3–2 defeat at Maidenhead United. He scored his first goal for the club in a 2–0 win against Hounslow on 9 October 1979.

Spending four seasons at the club, he was part of the team to finish as runners-up in the 1979–80 Southern League South Division campaign. He made his final appearance in a 1–0 defeat to Dover Athletic on 20 February 1982. Tilley played over 150 league games during his time at Turnfurlong Lane.

Hayes 
In August 1982, Tilley joined Isthmian League Premier Division side Hayes and spent two seasons with the club.

Staines Town (loan) 
In December 1983, he moved to Staines Town on a one-month loan.

Wycombe Wanderers 
At the end of the season he was off to Wycombe Wanderers and played regularly for the Chairboys in 1984–5.

Hayes 
Tilley returned to Hayes for the 1985–86 campaign and spent a single season with the club.

Slough Town 
In July 1986, Tilley signed for Isthmian League Premier Division club Slough Town. On 16 August, he made his debut in a 1–0 win against Walthamstow. He scored his first and only goal for the club in a 4–0 victory at Hendon on 20 September. He made a total of 30 appearances for the club before departing in late December.

He later played for Basingstoke Town and Southall.

Walton Casuals 
Tilley joined Combined Counties Football League club Walton Casuals for a brief spell in September 1997. He made his debut in a 0–0 draw with Viking Sports on 16 September, and was sent off in a 2–0 defeat against Ash United four days later. He failed to feature for the club again.

AFC Wimbledon 
In July 2002, Tilley made a cameo appearance for AFC Wimbledon in their first-ever friendly match – a 4–0 defeat to Sutton United.

Speaking about the match, he said: "Terry Eames called me out of the blue and asked if I could help out. I did a bit of pre-season training and then played at Sutton. It was really just to get the club going, proving the name doesn't die."

Statistics

References

Sources
Kevin Tilley at Aylesbury United

1957 births
Living people
Footballers from Feltham
English footballers
Association football defenders
Wimbledon F.C. players
Aylesbury United F.C. players
Hayes F.C. players
Wycombe Wanderers F.C. players
English Football League players